Specter of the Rose is a 1946 film noir thriller film written and directed by Ben Hecht and starring Judith Anderson, Ivan Kirov, Viola Essen, Michael Chekhov, and Lionel Stander, with choreography by Tamara Geva, and music by George Antheil.

Plot
A male ballet superstar is suspected of murdering his first wife (his former ballet partner) and now possibly threatening his new wife and ballet partner.

Andre Sanine has not performed since his wife's death on stage. He has been haunted by Le Spectre de la Rose, the music being played when she collapsed. But he is willing to attempt a comeback arranged by impresario Max "Poli" Polikoff, who tries to persuade ballet instructor Madame La Sylph that the time has come for Sanine, her former student, to return.

Sanine is to perform with Haidi, the company's new prodigy. As they rehearse, they also fall in love. La Sylph cautions her that she saw Sanine's rage in person before Nina's death. Haidi attempts to keep Sanine by her side for several days, concerned over signs of a relapse in his behavior.

Hearing the music, Sanine picks up a knife and places it at the throat of the sleeping Haidi, the woman he loves. He comes to his senses at the last possible second, then sacrifices himself for her sake.

Cast
 Judith Anderson as Madame La Sylph
 Michael Chekhov as Max Polikoff
 Ivan Kirov as Andre Sanine
 Viola Essen as Haidi
 Lionel Stander as Lionel Gans
 Charles Marshall as Specs McFarlan
 George Shdanoff as Kropotkin
 Billy Gray as Jack Jones
 Juan Panalle as Jibby
 Lew Hearn as Mr. Lyons
 Ferike Boros as Mamochka
 Bert Hanlon as Margolies
 Constantine as Alexis Bloom
 Fred Pollino as Giovanni
 Polly Rose as Olga

Background
Excerpts from the ballet Le Spectre de la Rose, which uses Carl Maria von Weber's piano piece Invitation to the Dance as orchestrated by Hector Berlioz, are featured in the film.

Adaptation
The screenplay was adapted for the radio series Inner Sanctum Mysteries on August 19, 1946. Ben Hecht appeared and the script was adapted by the playwright and Broadway stage actor Robert Sloane.

Reception
When the film was released, Variety magazine gave the film a mixed review.  The staff wrote, "Ben Hecht, to say the least, has done the expected by coming up with the unusual. Specter of the Rose was obviously a conscious attempt by Hecht to prove on how small a budget he could produce an acceptable picture. Reports are that it cost in the neighborhood of $160,000. The serious defect production wise is a general lack of polish that is at times disturbing ... Hecht’s direction and dialog give the acting a stylized artificiality that grows on the spectator as the picture progresses. Satire of the characterizations makes many of the film’s people virtually caricatures."

References

External links

Streaming audio
 Specter of the Rose on Inner Sanctum Mystery: August 19, 1946

1946 films
1940s thriller drama films
American thriller drama films
Films about ballet
American black-and-white films
Film noir
Films scored by George Antheil
Republic Pictures films
Films with screenplays by Ben Hecht
Films directed by Ben Hecht
1946 drama films
1940s American films